Cesaro may refer to:

 Cesarò, a town in Italy
 Claudio Castagnoli (born 1980), a Swiss professional wrestler formerly known as Cesaro
 Andrea Cesaro (born 1986), an Italian footballer
 Ernesto Cesàro (1859–1906), an Italian mathematician
Cesàro equation
Cesàro summation

See also